Right Frequency (播音人) was a 1998 24-episode sitcom starring Johnny Ng, Lina Ng, Sharon Au and Ryan Choo. The show later continued with Right Frequency II up to 1999. The show has rerun many times - in 2001, 2002, 2008 and 2020.

Plot
The show, set in the '60s, centers on the happenings in the Chinese-language radio station called Radio Delightful Sounds, abbrievated RDS.

Characters
Cheng Meiguang (Sharon Au)
Meiguang is the new bird of the radio station. She is somewhat ditzy and often daydreams.
Handsome (Ryan Zou Lian Fu)
Also known as Yan Dao. He is metrosexual and uses his charms to date girls, but to no avail.
Li Qing (Johnny Ng)
The veteran broadcaster. His tastes clash with that of Madam Bai.
Madam Bai (Hong Huifang)
The station supervisor. She often clashes with Li Qing, a running gag in the series.
Piaoyin (Lina Ng)
Also known as Little Trumpet. She is hot-tempered and tomboyish, and often go against Handsome.
Mee Pok
The office boy. He is longwinded and sleepwalks.

External links
Right Frequency on MediaCorp website

Singaporean television sitcoms